G.O.A.T. (Greatest of All Time) is the eighth studio album by American rapper LL Cool J, issued on Def Jam Recordings. It was released on September 12, 2000, and peaked at number one on the US Billboard 200. It was LL Cool J's first and, to date, only album to reach the top spot.

Background
The bulk of the album came about in the year of 1999, when DJ Scratch handed LL a CD of six instrumentals. The submission of beats took place when Scratch first met LL in the studio, as both men were working on the song "Ill Bomb," for Funkmaster Flex and DJ Big Kap's album, The Tunnel (1999).

Critical reception 

G.O.A.T. received generally positive reviews. At Metacritic, which assigns a normalized rating out of 100 to reviews from mainstream publications, the album received an average score of 73, based on 12 reviews. Entertainment Weeklys Tom Sinclair noted that the album "finds the Queens-bred rapper in near top form. Talking trash, passing the mic to guests like DMX and Snoop Dogg, reeling off endlessly inventive boasts — he makes it all seem as easy as chillin’ on the boulevard on a hot summer night. The only downer is the creeping note of defensiveness, as though the old goat (who’s all of 32) felt compelled to convince a new generation he’s still relevant."

Nathan Rabin from The A.V. Club found that "G.O.A.T. suffers from an unsure tone and a lack of thematic cohesion. Although a solid album by a gifted performer, it feels like the work of a rapper chasing trends instead of following his own path. That lack of vision makes the boast inherent in the title seem more hopelessly far-fetched than ever." In her mixed review for AllMusic, editor Diana Potts wrote that G.O.A.T "disappoints. [...] The theme of L.L. as the older seducer who is better than the current man of a girlish temptress has been common through L.L.'s albums. It's like listening to the confessions of a horny 14-year-old teenage boy in the girl's locker room. Even with the help of popular rap acts like DMX and Redman, L.L. Cool J has made the same album he did once before, with no new twists."

Chart performance 
G.O.A.T. debuted at number one on the US Billboard 200, becoming his first album to do so. It also reached number one on the Top R&B/Hip-Hop Albums chart. By 2004, the album had sold 818,000 copies in the United States.

Track listing 
Credits adapted from the album's liner notes.

Sample credits
"LL Cool J" contains a sample from "I Put a Spell on You" (1956) as performed by Screaming Jay Hawkins.
"Farmers" contains a sample from "Ungena Za Ulimwengu (Unite the World)" (1971) as performed by The Temptations.
"Hello" contains elements of "Telephone" (1984) as performed by Diana Ross.
"You and Me" contains an interpolation of "You'll Never Know" (1981) as performed by Hi-Gloss.
"Homicide" contains a sample from of "Harposaurus" (1992) as performed by Carlos Guedes
"Ill Bomb" contains a sample from "I'm Afraid the Masquerade Is Over" (1971) as performed by David Porter.

Charts

Weekly charts

Year-end charts

Certifications

References

2000 albums
LL Cool J albums
Def Jam Recordings albums
Hardcore hip hop albums
Albums produced by Rockwilder
Albums produced by Trackmasters
Albums produced by DJ Scratch